Johnny McEvoy (born 24 April 1945) is an Irish singer and entertainer of Country and Irish genre born in Banagher, County Offaly, Ireland.

Personal life 
Johnny was born in 1945, one of four children with two sisters and a brother to John and Emily McEvoy. His father was a bus driver and his mother was a housewife. Johnny's father was not initially supportive of his musical career: "It wasn't a bad relationship. We just seemed to have no relationship... until, I became famous." His mother, by contrast, was supportive, and suggested that he record Mursheen Durkin.

He met his wife Odette in 1967 and they married in 1970. The song The Planter's daughter is written about her and references her supposed ancestry from Strongbow. They have two children: Jonathan and Alice. 

McEvoy has admitted to finding fame "scary" and believes that it triggered his manic depression, an issue he first spoke about on Gay Byrne's talk show in the early 1990s. He gave up drinking in 1979: "Giving up was the easiest thing I ever did and it might have saved my life."

During his wife's illness, he cancelled all tour, recording and travel plans. To stay occupied, he wrote a songbook recounting the songs he has sung over the years, both his own compositions and covers. His wife helped by typing out song lyrics. Odette died of ovarian cancer on 12th November 2013. 

He now lives in Greystones and is in a relationship with Mary.

Career
He was initially part of a duo called "Ramblers Two", the other member being fellow art student Michael Crotty. Their fame was enhanced when they supported the Rolling Stones when they came to Ireland in 1965 in the Adelphi cinema. After a stint touring Ireland and England in the mid-sixties, the two went their separate ways. Johnny McEvoy's first big break came in late 1966 when he recorded "Mursheen Durkin," an old ballad from the west of Ireland. It topped the charts at number one for three consecutive weeks. It was followed by "The Boston Burglar" which also reached number one in the charts. His first tour to the U.S. was in 1967, highlighted by a concert at New York City's Carnegie Hall. It was at this stage he had his third number one Hit with the song "Nora" (a version of When You and I Were Young, Maggie)," from Seán O'Casey's famous play The Plough and the Stars.

He later formed a band in the 1970s. He wrote his first song "Long Before Your Time." It too reached number one, becoming his fourth and to date last number one in the Irish charts. He went on to write many more songs, many of which have become standards that have been recorded by other artists including "Long Before Your Time," "Michael," "Going To California," "The Ballad of John Williams," "Richman's Garden," "Never Learned To Dance," and "The Ballad of Anne Frank."

In 2010 a documentary on the life and times of Johnny McEvoy, "For the Poor and for the Gentry," was televised. For the production of the documentary McEvoy re-recorded his first number one hit, most popular and biggest selling song, "Mursheen Durkin," a collaboration recording with Sharon Shannon and her Big Band. The renewal of the classic was also included on a double album and DVD "For the poor and for the Gentry - The Definitive Johnny McEvoy," which was released later that year.

Live performances
Aside from an illustrious recording career, Johnny McEvoy is perhaps best known for his live performances and tours in Ireland and on the international circuit. His renown is worldwide and he has spent many years travelling and performing. In concert, he sings and plays acoustic guitar. In the 1970s, he toured with a large band, which included two other guitarists, bass, keyboard and fiddle. In later years, he was often accompanied by only one other guitarist, such as Philip O'Duffy. He typically plays a combination of his own compositions and traditional songs such as Carrickfergus, The Boston Burglar and The Leaving of Liverpool.

Discography

Singles

Albums 
 For The Poor and the Gentry (1967)
 With An Eye To Your Eye (1968)
 All Our Wars Were Merry, All our Songs Are Sad (1970)
 Best of Johnny McEvoy (1975)
 Sounds Like McEvoy (1975)
 Where My Eileen Is Waiting (1975)
 Long Before Your Time (1976)
 Leaves in the Wind (1977)
 I'll Spend A Time With You (1978)
 Twenty Greatest Hits (1979)
 Johnny McEvoy Goes Country (1980)
 Since Maggie Went Away (1985)
 The Legendary Johnny McEvoy (2002) 
 Going to California (2003)
 20 Collected Irish Ballads (2008)
 Basement Sessions (2014)
 Into the Cauldron (2017)

References

Further reading

Johnny Mcevoy CD's
Kildare.ie
Irishrecords.com

Living people
1947 births
Irish country singers
Irish male singers
Musicians from County Offaly